Parking guidance and information (PGI) systems, or car park guidance systems, present drivers with dynamic information on parking within controlled areas. The systems combine traffic monitoring, communication, processing and variable message sign technologies to provide the service.

Modern parking lots utilize a variety of technologies to help motorists find unoccupied parking spaces, car location when returning to the vehicle and improve their experience.  This includes adaptive lighting sensors and parking space indicators (red for occupied, green for available and blue is reserved for the disabled; above every parking space), and indoor positioning systems (IPS).

PGI systems are a product of the worldwide initiative for the development of intelligent transportation system in urban areas. PGI systems can assist in the development of safe, efficient and environmentally friendly transportation network.

PGI systems are designed to aid in the search for vacant parking spaces by directing drivers to car parks where occupancy levels are low. The objective is to reduce search time, which in turn reduces congestion on the surrounding roads for other traffic with related benefits to air pollution with the ultimate aim of enhancement of the urban area. 

Parking guidance systems have evolved a lot in recent times. Ultrasound and laser technologies provide information on the availability of parking spaces throughout the parking facility. At the same time, new camera-based technologies now make it possible to read the license plate of the vehicle in each parking space. This is an added value since it allows the identification of a specific vehicle in a specific parking space and, in addition, sometimes records possible incidents occurring in that space. These new methods increase security and revenue for the parking owners.

Parking guidance system

Parking guidance systems (PGS) have different elements:

Ultrasound detectors
Camera-based sensors 
Individual indicators
Zone Controllers
Data / Intermediate Controllers
Central Control System
Signs or displays
Kiosks

References 

Civil engineering
Transportation engineering
Urban planning
Articles containing video clips